Zhong Ling may refer to:

 Zhong Ling (rhythmic gymnast) (born 1983), Chinese
 Zhong Ling (Demi-Gods and Semi-Devils), a female fictional character in the novel Demi-Gods and Semi-Devils
 Chung Ling (born 1945), Taiwan/Chinese poet, translator and critic